"Give Him a Great Big Kiss" (sometimes entitled "Great Big Kiss") is a song written by Shadow Morton and performed by the Shangri-Las.  It debuted at number 83 on the Billboard Hot 100 in late December 1964, and peaked at #18 for two weeks in late January/early February 1965. It was featured on their 1965 album Leader of the Pack.

The single was produced by Shadow Morton.

Other versions
Brian Protheroe covers it on his 1976 album Leave Him to Heaven.
New York Dolls guitarist Johnny Thunders does a solo version of the song on his 1978 album So Alone.
A version by the New York Dolls also appears on their 1985 compilation album Night of the Living Dolls. Also, on the band's 1973 self-titled album, lead singer David Johansen quotes the "Give Him a Great Big Kiss" line, "you'd best believe I'm in love L-U-V", in the opening of "Looking for a Kiss". "Looking for a Kiss" tells the story of adolescent romantic desire hampered by peers who use drugs.
Tracey Ullman released a version of the song on her 1984 album You Caught Me Out.
The Secret Goldfish released it as a single in 1997, but it did not chart.
It's My Party! released a version of the song on their 2000 album Can I Get to Know You Better?
Kate Nash and Billy Bragg released a version of the song as the B-side to Nash's 2010 single "Kiss That Grrrl".
Bette Midler released a version of the song on her 2014 album It's the Girls!

References

1964 songs
1964 singles
1997 singles
Songs written by Shadow Morton
The Shangri-Las songs
Johnny Thunders songs
Tracey Ullman songs
New York Dolls songs
Kate Nash songs
Billy Bragg songs
Bette Midler songs
Red Bird Records singles
Song recordings produced by Peter Collins (record producer)